Lasiodictis is a moth genus in the subfamily Autostichinae. It contains the species Lasiodictis melistoma, which is found in Assam, India.

The wingspan is 16–18 mm. The forewings are dark fuscous, with a faint purplish tinge. The hindwings are blackish-fuscous.

References

Autostichinae